Idiot Road is the seventh album by the Canadian musical comedy group The Arrogant Worms. It was released in 2001.

Track listing

Background
According to band member Trevor Strong, the song "Worst Seat on the Plane" was never performed live due to Idiot Road being released on September 19, 2001, the week after the September 11 attacks. He also states that Idiot Road is probably his least favourite Arrogant Worms album.

References

2001 albums
The Arrogant Worms albums